Thought is a mental process, in which conscious cognitive processes can happen independently of sensory stimulation. It is an instance of thinking and is used as its synonym.

Thought may also refer to:
 In philosophy, thought is also a synonym for idea
 School of thought, a collections of ideas that result from the adoption of a particular paradigm
 Thought: Fordham University Quarterly, published by Fordham University
 Thought: A Journal of Philosophy, published by Wiley-Blackwell for the Northern Institute of Philosophy 
 "Thought", in Gottlob Frege's theory of meaning, "something for which the question of truth can arise at all"
 "Thought" (Myel), a short story by Leonid Andreyev
 Thought (film), a 1916 Russian silent film
 Thought (sculpture), a sculpture by S. D. Merkurov
 Thoughts (album), a 1985 album by Bill Dixon
 "Thoughts" (song), a 2013 song by Luna Sea
 "Thoughts", a 1969 song by Vanilla Fudge
"Thoughts", a 2019 song by Charli XCX